The "Chant des Partisans" ("Song of the Partisans") was the most popular song of the Free French and French Resistance during World War II.

The piece was written and put to melody in London in 1943 after Anna Marly heard a Russian song, namely Po dolinam i po vzgoriam, that provided her with inspiration. Joseph Kessel and Maurice Druon wrote the French lyrics. It was performed by Anna Marly, broadcast by the BBC and adopted by the maquis. The lyrics of the song revolve around the idea of a life-or-death struggle for national liberation.
After the war the "Chant des Partisans" was so popular, it was proposed as a new national anthem for France. It became for a short while the unofficial national anthem, next to the official "La Marseillaise".

Anna Marly also wrote and performed a more introspective song, "La Complainte du Partisan", which was later adapted and translated into English as "The Partisan". It was most famously covered by Leonard Cohen. The two songs are sometimes confused.

In Korea, the melody of the song was adopted as the march of the Korean Liberation Army.

Literature 
Richard Raskin, "Le Chant des Partisans: Functions of a Wartime Song." Folklore [U.K.], 102, 1 (Summer, 1991), pp. 62–76.

External links

 "Le chant des partisans"
 National Federation of Deported and Imprisoned Resistance Fighters and Patriots
  (by author)
 
 French Prime minister
 Version latest Gómez Naharro:
 :es:El canto de los partisanos#Int.C3.A9rpretes

1943 songs
Songs written by Anna Marly
French-language songs
French patriotic songs
French Resistance
Korean independence movement
Songs of the French Resistance